Bart Franklin Hester (born December 9, 1977) is an American politician serving as a member of the Arkansas Senate from the 33rd district. He has served since 2013, and was nominated president pro tempore of the Senate for the 94th Arkansas General Assembly.

Early life and education 
A native of Conway, Arkansas, Hester graduated from Green Forest High School and earned a Bachelor of Science degree in business management from the Sam M. Walton College of Business at the University of Arkansas. For three years, Hester played on the Arkansas Razorbacks baseball team.

Career 
Since 2005, Hester has worked as a real estate agent. He was elected to the Arkansas Senate in November 2012 and assumed office on January 14, 2013. From 2013 to 2015, Hester served as vice chair of the House Children and Youth Committee. During the 2017 legislative session, he served as chair of the House Public Retirement and Social Security Programs Committee. Since 2021, Hester has served as chair of the House Senate Efficiency Committee. Hester has also served as majority leader of the Senate. In 2022, Hester was chosen as President Pro Tempore for the 2023 session.

References 

1977 births
Living people
People from Benton County, Arkansas
People from Cave Springs, Arkansas
People from Conway, Arkansas
People from Faulkner County, Arkansas
Republican Party Arkansas state senators
University of Arkansas alumni